FutureM is an annual two-day marketing conference; a series of events, discussions and parties throughout the Greater Boston, Massachusetts, United States, area. The conference offers marketing and technology practitioners from around the world the opportunity to network, explore media and technology opportunities, and discover the future of marketing.

Overview 
FutureM is the brainchild of the Massachusetts Innovation & Technology Exchange (MITX). The event focuses on topics related to the future of marketing and media covering tracks on innovative technology, content and creative, usability and design, intelligence and insight and industry best practices. FutureM presentation sessions are community-created and community-driven.

History 
MITX launched the first FutureM in 2010, with the inspiration of HubSpot CEO and founder Brian Halligan and David Meerman Scott, under the leadership of then-executive director Kiki Mills.

2010

FutureM 2010 took place October 4–8 and saw 53 events at 31 venues in the Boston area, with over 3,000 attendees. The event series featured over 100 speakers, presentations from more than 10 universities and covered 162 hours of content.

Participants included Massachusetts-based companies HubSpot, MassChallenge, Holland-Mark, Mullen Advertising and The Next Great Generation, a crowd-sourced Gen-Y blog created by Edward Boches. Speakers included Groundswell author Josh Bernoff, former CEO for Ogilvy, Mark Traino, and Jay Sampson, a General Manager of Sales at Microsoft Advertising.

2012

FutureM 2012 took place from October 23–26 in three locations in the Boston area - the Hynes Convention Center in Back Bay; the Fidelity Center for Applied Technology in the Innovation District; and at the Microsoft New England Research and Development Center (NERD) in Kendall Square.

References

External links 
 FutureM website
 MITX blog
 TNGG website
 Social Media Company Boston

Marketing organizations
Annual events in Boston